Bind or BIND may refer to:

Science and technology
 BIND (Berkeley Internet Name Domain), Domain Name System software
 Bind (higher-order function), an operation in a monad
 Bind, a client to a server in client–server computing
 Neodymium bismuthide, a chemical with the formula BiNd or NdBi.

Other uses
 Bookbinding, the process of physically assembling a book from a number of folded or unfolded sheets of paper or other material
 Foot binding, the custom of applying tight binding to the feet of young girls to prevent further growth
 Bind (caste), Indian caste name
 Bind rune, a ligature of two or more runes
 Bind (chess), a strong grip or stranglehold on a position that is difficult for the opponent to break

See also
 Bondage (disambiguation)
 Binding (disambiguation)
 Binder (disambiguation)